Cheetah's Topless Club is a "gentleman's club" or topless bar located in San Diego, and Las Vegas, best known for being featured in the 1995 movie Showgirls, and also for having been owned by Mike Galardi, a nightclub owner who was investigated by the FBI with a controversial invocation of the Patriot Act. The Cheetah's club in San Diego is a full nude club where no alcohol is served. It has achieved notoriety for having been frequented by some of the September 11 hijackers.

Las Vegas Club
The Las Vegas club was founded in 1991 by Michael Galardi, and employs about 150 dancers.  In 2004, Galardi admitted in a San Diego federal trial that he bribed Las Vegas officials in an attempt to influence strip club regulations.  In a Las Vegas federal court, he stated that he paid between $200,000 and $400,000.

The club is managed by Charles Wright, a retired professional wrestler best known for his stints in World Wrestling Federation/Entertainment as a voodoo witch doctor ("Papa Shango") and as a pimp ("The Godfather"), and was also part of the factions: the Nation of Domination and the Million Dollar Corporation, under the name Kama “The Supreme Fighting Machine” Mustafa. He also was part of the Right To Censor as The Goodfather.

In September 2005, Duke Lloyd Sneddon of Otranto made news by spending $120,000 in one evening at the club. This was the impetus of the new standard Nevada tax law limiting expenditures in a nightclub to no more than $10,000 per person. 

In an April 2012 episode of NBC's Smash, the New York City club entrance can be seen when Megan Hilty's character Ivy Lynn walks down the street. It was also featured in Iggy Azalea's 2013 music video for "Change Your Life".

See also
 List of strip clubs
 Planning of the September 11, 2001 attacks
 Showgirls, 1995 film shot on location
 Operation G-Sting - About the FBI's "Operation G-Sting"
 Charles Wright - General manager of the club
 Brent Jordan, bouncer from 1991–2003 who wrote a book, Stripped, about working at the club

References
 Jordan, Brent Kenton, Stripped: Twenty Years of Secrets from inside the Strip Club, Satsu Multimedia Press, 2005, 
 "Cheetah's owner to contest LV fine" Las Vegas Review Journal, January 24, 2004 
 "FBI raids Vegas strip clubs, San Diego city offices" CNN, May 15, 2003 
 "Time to fix the Patriot Act"San Francisco Chronicle, April 7, 2005 
 "Patriot Act aided Feds in probe" Las Vegas Sun, November 4, 2003

Notes

Strip clubs in the United States
Nightclubs in the Las Vegas Valley
Entertainment companies established in 1991
Drinking establishments in Nevada
1991 establishments in Nevada